Plasmodium atheruri is a species of the genus Plasmodium subgenus Vinckeia. As in all members of this genus, it is parasitic on vertebrate and insect hosts. The natural vertebrate host is the African porcupine (Atherurus africanus) but it is possible to infect the large vesper mouse (Calomys callosus) and Meriones unguiculatus.

Taxonomy 
This species was described in 1958 by den Berghe, Peel, Chardome and Lambrecht.

Description 
Exoerythrocytic schizogony in this species usually lasts 4 to 6 days but occasionally schizonts have been found in the liver at day 8. Two types of infection are recognised: an acute form characterised by  large trophozoites, schizonts with 8 to 16 merozoites, gametocytes and infectivity to Anopheles species; and a chronic form following the acute form by 15 to 21 days and which is characterized by small trophozoites and schizonts producing 4 merozoites.

Vectors 
Anopheles machardyi
Anopheles smithii
Anopheles stephensi

Distribution 
This species is found in Africa.

References 

atheruri